Guido Onor (born June 20, 1948 in Arona) is a retired Italian professional football player.

1948 births
Living people
People from Arona, Piedmont
Italian footballers
Serie A players
Juventus F.C. players
S.S. Lazio players
A.C. Monza players
U.S. Livorno 1915 players
Mantova 1911 players
A.C.R. Messina players
U.S. Salernitana 1919 players
Association football defenders
Footballers from Piedmont
Sportspeople from the Province of Novara